The US 62 Bridge over Crooked Creek is a historic bridge near Pyatt, Arkansas. It carries US Highway 62 (US 62) and US 412 across Crooked Creek, which flows through the center of Pyatt to the northwest.

Dimensions
The bridge is a three-span steel Warren Truss structure, set on concrete piers and abutments.

History

The bridge was built in 1948 by the Pioneer Construction Company of Kansas City, Missouri, and is one of the finest Warren truss bridges in the region.

The bridge was listed on the National Register of Historic Places in 2000.

See also
 U.S. 62 White River Bridge
 List of bridges on the National Register of Historic Places in Arkansas
 National Register of Historic Places listings in Marion County, Arkansas

References

Bridges completed in 1948
Transportation in Marion County, Arkansas
Road bridges on the National Register of Historic Places in Arkansas
U.S. Route 62
Bridges of the United States Numbered Highway System
National Register of Historic Places in Marion County, Arkansas
Steel bridges in the United States
Warren truss bridges in the United States
1948 establishments in Arkansas